Macov is a village and municipality in the Dunajská Streda District in the Trnava Region of south-west Slovakia.

Geography
The municipality lies at an altitude of 123 metres and covers an area of 2.720 km².

History
In the 9th century, the territory of Macov became part of the Kingdom of Hungary. The village was first recorded in 1367 by its Hungarian name as Machhaza. Until the end of World War I, it was part of Hungary and fell within the Somorja district of Pozsony County. After the Austro-Hungarian army disintegrated in November 1918, Czechoslovakian troops occupied the area. After the Treaty of Trianon of 1920, the village became officially part of Czechoslovakia. In November 1938, the First Vienna Award granted the area to Hungary and it was held by Hungary until 1945. After Soviet occupation in 1945, Czechoslovakian administration returned and the village became officially part of Czechoslovakia in 1945.

Demography 

Census 2011: 237 inhabitants - 106 people (45%) were Slovaks, 86 (36%) Hungarians and 45 (19%) others nationality.
 
In 1910, the village had 142, in 2001 was 155 .
The villages's population as Roman Catholicism is the majority religion of the village, its adherents numbering 92.90% of the total population.

References 

Villages and municipalities in Dunajská Streda District
Hungarian communities in Slovakia